NGC 7041 is a lenticular galaxy located about 80 million light-years away in the constellation of Indus. NGC 7041 was discovered by astronomer John Herschel on July 7, 1834.  

NGC 7041 is part of the Indus Triplet of galaxies which contains the nearby galaxy NGC 7049 and the galaxy NGC 7029.

See also 
 NGC 7007
 List of NGC objects (7001–7840)

References

External links 

Lenticular galaxies
Indus (constellation)
7041
66463
Astronomical objects discovered in 1834